A tortillon (also blending stump) is a cylindrical drawing tool, tapered at the end and usually made of rolled paper, used by artists to smudge or blend marks made with charcoal, Conté crayon, pencil or other drawing utensils.

A blending stump is similar to a tortillon but is longer, more tightly wrapped, and pointed at both ends. Tortillons produce slightly different textures than stumps when blending, and they also are hollow, as opposed to stumps being solid.

Cleaning of tortillons and stumps usually involves removing the used outer layer of paper by scraping or rubbing the implement on an abrasive surface, such as sandpaper, carpet, pink rubber erasers, or an emery board. Some people also whittle off the tip if it becomes dull, or mashed in.

Visual arts materials